

First round

|}

Second round

|}

Third round

|}

Fourth round

|}

Football cup competitions in Malta